Ravi Venkateswarlu Kalpana (born 5 May 1996) is an Indian cricketer. She started her national-level career as a wicket-keeper and right-handed batter in the India women's national cricket team.

Personal life 
Her father is an auto rickshaw driver and Kalpana struggled to convince her parents to not get her married off at an early age: "My most memorable win is so far to convince my family and stop my marriage which could have happened almost abruptly", she said.

Kalpana works for Indian Railways, and lives in Vijayawada. She has B.Com. degree from Nalanda Degree College in Vijayawada.

Career 
She started her career by playing for the state team with an allowance of Rs 4000 from the Andhra Pradesh Cricket Association (APCA).

She was initially a part of South Zone division for the Under 16 team. In 2011, she moved on to play for the Under 19 team and then for India Green Team in 2012, to Senior South Zone team in 2014. She was then selected for the Indian Women's Cricket Team in 2015. It was then that she made her international debut in 2015 against New Zealand.

References

External links 
 

1996 births
Living people
Indian women cricketers
India women One Day International cricketers
Andhra women cricketers
Cricketers from Andhra Pradesh
IPL Trailblazers cricketers
People from Krishna district